The Parliament of Vanuatu is the unicameral legislative body of the Republic of Vanuatu.

It was established by chapter 4 of the 1980 Constitution, upon Vanuatu's independence from France and the United Kingdom.

The functioning of Parliament is derived from the British Westminster system, and includes the principle of parliamentary supremacy, within the limits of the Constitution. The President, as a figurehead, may not veto parliamentary legislation, unless he considers it may be contrary to the Constitution, in which case he may refer it to the Supreme Court, and veto it only if the Supreme Court declares it to be contrary to the Constitution. Parliament is composed of fifty-two members, directly elected by citizens from multi-member constituencies for a four-year term.

Parliament elects the Prime Minister from among its members. Members of Parliament are also, along with the presidents of Regional Councils, members of the electoral college which elects the President, for a five-year term.

The current Speaker of the Parliament is the Hon. Seoule Simeon who has held the position since June 2021.

Members
This is a list of members of the 12th Parliament of Vanuatu returned in the 2022 elections.

See also
 Law of Vanuatu
 Politics of Vanuatu
 List of speakers of the Parliament of Vanuatu
 List of legislatures by country

External links 
 Official Website of the Parliament of Vanuatu
 Video archives of Parliament's sessions

References 

Vanautu
Politics of Vanuatu
Political organisations based in Vanuatu
Government of Vanuatu
Vanuatu
Vanuatu